Pan Peninsula, also known as 1 Millharbour, is a residential development on the Isle of Dogs, London located near South Quay DLR station. Pan Peninsula is one of several high-rise residential developments that have been constructed on the Isle of Dogs.

Design
 
The East tower was topped-out in September 2007. Both buildings were completed in 2008, with the first residents moving in from early 2009.

The project was designed by Skidmore, Owings and Merrill and was developed by Irish property firm Ballymore.

The towers are connected by a reception area containing a concierge foyer, multi-floor gym, private cinema and terraced restaurant. The 48th floor of the East tower houses a cocktail bar which is open to residents and their guests. The tops of the towers have been designed to resemble lanterns, providing strong LED lighting features that are very visible on the skyline and gradually change colour.

Apartments
The West Tower contains 430 units, while the East Tower houses 356 units. The towers house mainly two-bedroom, one-bedroom and studio apartments, all containing balconies. The studio apartments are relatively small, containing storage space in the majority of the finished walls, and a fold-up bed that locks into the wall space, creating a dining room environment. In 2006, the penthouse was sold for £7 million.

See also
Canary Wharf
Riverside South (Canary Wharf)
Tall buildings in London
Phoenix Heights

References

External links

Canary Wharf buildings
Skyscrapers in the London Borough of Tower Hamlets
Residential skyscrapers in London
Residential buildings completed in 2009
Skidmore, Owings & Merrill buildings
Twin towers
Millwall